Bilston Central is a tram stop in Bilston near Wolverhampton, England. It was opened on 31 May 1999 and is situated on Midland Metro Line 1.

The stop is in the brick-lined former Great Western Railway cutting in the centre of the town, and is next to Bilston bus station. The platforms here are staggered, with the Birmingham platform being further north than the Wolverhampton platform, this was made necessary by the narrowness of the cutting.

The tram stop is a short distance to the north from the original Bilston Central railway station which was situated on the Birmingham Snow Hill-Wolverhampton Low Level Line and closed in 1972.

Services
Mondays to Fridays, Midland Metro services in each direction between Birmingham and Wolverhampton run at six to eight-minute intervals during the day, and at fifteen-minute intervals during the evenings and on Sundays. They run at eight minute intervals on Saturdays.

References

External links
 Article on this Metro stop from Rail Around Birmingham & the West Midlands
 Article on this Metro stop from thetrams.co.uk

Transport in Wolverhampton
West Midlands Metro stops
Railway stations in Great Britain opened in 1999